Union Corner Provincial Park is a provincial park in Prince Edward Island, Canada.

Union Corner is a day use park only and open from June to September. The park is named for the nearby community of Union Corner, Prince Edward Island.

When expose during low tides the park has an abundance of shellfish and attract swimmers as well.

References

Provincial parks of Prince Edward Island
Parks in Prince County, Prince Edward Island